Pope Anastasius may refer to:
Pope Anastasius I, Pope from 399 to 401
Pope Anastasius II, Pope from 496 to 498
Pope Anastasius of Alexandria, 605–616
Pope Anastasius III, Pope from 911 to 913
Pope Anastasius IV, Pope from 1153 to 1154
Antipope Anastasius

Anastasius